İskenderun İESK is the deaf football club located in İskenderun in Hatay, southern Turkey. The team competes in Turkish Deaf Football First League.

League participations
Turkish Deaf Football First League: 2013–present

League performances

References

External links 

Sport in İskenderun
Parasports in Turkey
Deaf sports organizations
Football clubs in Hatay
Deaf culture in Turkey